Banghiang River (Se Banghiang, Sê Băng Hiêng in Vietnamese) is a river in Savannakhet Province of Laos and a tributary the Mekong River. It originates on the west side of the Annamite Range and joins the Mekong near Savannakhet city.

 Rivers of Laos
 Rivers of Vietnam
 Tributaries of the Mekong River
Rivers of Quảng Trị province